"Line Up" is alternative rock group Elastica's second major single, released on 31 January 1994. The track was the first song on their debut album, Elastica. It spent three weeks on the UK Singles Chart, peaking at #20 on 12 February 1994.

Track listing

UK CD & 12" single
 "Line Up"
 "Vaseline" (Demo Version)
 "Rockunroll" (Peel Session)
 "Annie" (Peel Session)

AUS CD single
 "Line Up"
 "Gloria"
 "Car Wash"
 "Brighton Rock"

Soundtracks

The song appears on the soundtrack to the 1995 movie Mallrats. It also appeared in Not Another Teen Movie.

References

1994 singles
Elastica songs
1994 songs
Songs written by Justine Frischmann